Nela Louise Zisser (born 6 June 1992) is a New Zealand model and Miss Earth New Zealand 2013, as well as a competitive eater.

Early life
Zisser was born in Christchurch, New Zealand. She was scouted at the age of sixteen by a local modelling agency and later moved to Auckland when she was eighteen to pursue her modelling career.

Career

Miss Earth 2013 competition

Zisser won the Miss Earth New Zealand 2013 competition, an annual beauty pageant promoting environmental awareness. She was awarded the title after the original winner couldn't compete due to schedule complications. Zisser was to represent New Zealand in the Miss Earth 2013 final on 7 December in the Philippines. However, she was diagnosed with food poisoning a week before the final and withdrew from the competition. Zisser continued to be involved in environmental programmes in New Zealand over her reigning year.

References

New Zealand beauty pageant winners
1992 births
Living people
New Zealand female models